Sarah-e Shadadi (also Romanized as Sarāḥ-e Shahdādī) is a village in Tarom Rural District, in the Central District of Hajjiabad County, Hormozgan Province, Iran. At the 2006 census, its population was 718, in 153 families.

References 

Populated places in Hajjiabad County